Yadollah Royaee (7 May 1932 – 12 September 2022) was an Iranian poet of the New Wave or the Poem of Imagination in Iranian Modern Literature.

Life and career
Royaee was born in Damqan, Semnan Province, Iran on 7 May 1932. He was a graduate of college of law and human sciences and he had worked for the state television for several years. His poetry renewed debate about the relative value of form and context in modern Persian poetry. Yadollah was careful to produce unity in his poems. His sea songs reflect French symbolism. He moved to exotic marine landscape and creates glorious lyrical images, focusing mostly on symbols rather than metaphors in image building. His lyrics are deeply imbued with Persian mysticism. Royaee invented and introduced a style in Persian poetry which he named Espacementalisme. His work "Le Passé en je signature" was translated into French in 2002. He died in Paris, France on 12 September 2022, at the age of 90.

Works
 On Empty Roads
 Sea Songs
 The Loneliness
 Of I love you
 Overflowing
 Seventy Gravestones
 The Past me: Signature

References

 Yadollah Royaee on Caroun.com

External links
 http://www.yadollahroyai.com, his official blog and poetic homepage (Persian)
 his poems
 The Past me: Signature

1932 births
2022 deaths
20th-century Iranian poets
21st-century Iranian poets
Iranian male poets
Persian-language poets
People from Semnan Province